Klaus Erich Bahner (30 November 1937 - 13 October 2011) was a German former field hockey player who competed at the 1964 Summer Olympics and the 1968 Summer Olympics. He was born in Crimmitschau, Saxony, Germany.

Olympic events 
1964 Summer Olympics in Tokyo, competing for the United Team of Germany:
 Men's field hockey – 5th place

1968 Summer Olympics in Mexico City, competing for East Germany:
 Men's field hockey – 11th place

References

External links
 

1937 births
2011 deaths
German male field hockey players
Field hockey players at the 1964 Summer Olympics
Field hockey players at the 1968 Summer Olympics
Olympic field hockey players of the United Team of Germany
Olympic field hockey players of East Germany
People from Crimmitschau
Sportspeople from Saxony
20th-century German people